Caffrocrambus is a genus of moths of the family Crambidae.

Species
Caffrocrambus albifascia Bassi, 2002
Caffrocrambus albistrigatus Bassi, 2002
Caffrocrambus alcibiades Bleszynski, 1961
Caffrocrambus angulilinea (Warren, 1914)
Caffrocrambus carneades Bassi, 2002
Caffrocrambus chalcimerus (Hampson, 1919)
Caffrocrambus decolorelloides Bleszynski, 1970
Caffrocrambus decolorellus (Walker, 1863)
Caffrocrambus democritus Bassi, 1994
Caffrocrambus dichotomellus (Hampson, 1919)
Caffrocrambus endoxantha (Hampson, 1919)
Caffrocrambus fulvus Bassi, 2002
Caffrocrambus fuscus Bassi, 2002
Caffrocrambus galileii Bassi, 2002
Caffrocrambus heraclitus Bassi, 1994
Caffrocrambus homerus (Bleszynski, 1961)
Caffrocrambus husserli Bassi, 2002
Caffrocrambus jansei Bassi, 2002
Caffrocrambus krooni Bassi, 2002
Caffrocrambus leucippus Bassi, 1994
Caffrocrambus leucofascialis (Janse, 1922)
Caffrocrambus luteus Bassi, 2002
Caffrocrambus machiavellii Bassi, 2002
Caffrocrambus ochreus Bleszynski, 1970
Caffrocrambus parmenides Bassi, 1994
Caffrocrambus polyphemus Bassi, 2002
Caffrocrambus savonarolae Bassi, 2002
Caffrocrambus sordidella (Marion, 1957)
Caffrocrambus szunyoghyi Bassi, 2002
Caffrocrambus undilineatus (Hampson, 1919)

References

  1994: Contributi allo studio delle Crambinae (Lepidoptera: Crambidae). VIII. Note sul genere Caffocrambus [sic] Bleszynski, con descrizione di nuove specie. – Bollettino del Museo Regionale di Scienze Naturali Torino 12 (2): 367–379.
 , 2002: Revision of the Afrotropical species of the genus  Caffrocrambus  I: the  angulilinea  and  homerus  species groups with the description of a new genus and new species (Lepidoptera Pyralidae Crambinae). Bollettino della Società Entomologica Italiana 134(2): 129-162.
  1970: New genera and species of tropical Crambinae (Studies on the Crambinae, Lepidoptera, Pyralidae, Part 48). Tijdschrift voor Entomologie, 's Gravenhage. 113: 1-26.

Crambinae
Crambidae genera
Taxa named by Stanisław Błeszyński